The Gallery of Maps (Italian: Galleria delle carte geografiche) is a gallery located on the west side of the Belvedere Courtyard in the Vatican containing a series of painted topographical maps of Italy based on drawings by friar and geographer Ignazio Danti.

The gallery was commissioned in 1580 by Pope Gregory XIII as part of other artistic works commissioned by the Pope to decorate the Vatican. It took Danti three years (1580–1583) to complete the 40 panels of the 120 m long gallery.

Design

The panels map the entirety of the Italian peninsula in large-scale frescoes, each depicting a region as well as a perspective view of its most prominent city.  It is said that these maps are approximately 80% accurate.

With the Apennines as a partition, one side depicts the regions surrounded by the Ligurian and Tyrrhenian Seas and the other depicts the regions surrounded by the Adriatic Sea.

After the series of regional maps, there are two general geographical maps: 

Ancient Italy (with the inscription “Commendatur Italia locorum salubritate, coeli temperie, soli ubertate”)

Modern Italy (with the inscription “Italia artium studiorumque plena semper est habita”).

At the beginning and at the end of the gallery:

General view of the four major Italian ports of the sixteenth century: Venice, Ancona, Genoa and Civitavecchia.

Other decorations
The decorations on the vaulted ceiling are the work of a group of Mannerist artists including Cesare Nebbia and Girolamo Muziano.

See also
 Vatican Museums
 Vatican City
 Index of Vatican City-related articles

References

External links
 

Vatican Museums
1580s paintings
Cartography by country